State Route 8 (SR 8) is a road in the U.S. state of Ohio. SR 8 stretches from the eastern junction of Interstate 76 (I-76) and I-77 in Akron to Public Square in Cleveland. It is one of nine routes to enter downtown Cleveland at Public Square. The route's first few miles are as a limited-access freeway from I-76 and I-77, heading north.  The freeway section of the highway has 16 interchanges, and is cosigned with SR 59 for a short distance from Perkins Street in Akron to Front Street in Cuyahoga Falls.  The freeway portion ends at I-271 in Macedonia.

Route description
SR 8 begins at an interchange with I-76 and I-77 southeast of downtown Akron. The Akron Expressway, as the freeway is known within the city limits, heads up the east side of Akron. SR 8's first interchange is the main access to the central business district and the University of Akron. Just before leaving central Akron, an interchange with Perkins Street begins a concurrency with SR 59. The road continues over the North Expressway Viaduct, which crosses over several railroads and the Little Cuyahoga River, before continuing to the north side of Akron. Between exits 3B and 4, SR 8/59 cross into Cuyahoga Falls. Those two exits connect with the same stretch of road but have different names and are on different sides of the city limit.

The freeway continues north through Cuyahoga Falls, parallel to the Cuyahoga River; the freeway crosses the river just before exit 6. SR 59 leaves the freeway at exit 6 to head east toward Kent. SR 8, which until now has been heading slightly northeast, turns north and northwest after exit 6, interchanging with Graham Road in the process. The road continues through a relatively rural area on the eastern edge of Cuyahoga Valley National Park. Exits 10, 12, and 14A-B are normally only used as a connection to Hudson or Blossom Music Center and other points in the national park, as their immediate areas are sparsely populated and underdeveloped. Once it passes the Ohio Turnpike, SR 8 continues through a wooded area. Its last exit is with I-271, after which it enters Cleveland's southeastern suburbs.

Now known as Northfield Road, SR 8 continues parallel to I-271, intersecting SR 82, SR 14, and SR 17. Following its intersection with SR 17, SR 8 enters a brief concurrency with SR 43, during which it intersects I-480. SR 43 splits off, and SR 8 continues northward before joining US 422 and turning to the west. The new road is briefly known as Chagrin Boulevard before becoming Kinsman Road. SR 8/US 422 continues to the northwest through the immediate Cleveland area; during its approach to downtown Cleveland, SR 87 joins the concurrency, followed by an interchange with I-77.

For its final mile, SR 8/SR 87/US 422 picks up a concurrency of SR 14/SR 43, after which the road becomes known as Ontario Street and turns toward Public Square, the northern terminus of SR 8. SR 8's northern terminus is shared with six other roads: SR 3, SR 14, SR 43, SR 87, US 42, and US 422.

History
SR 8 was one of the original state highways in Ohio. It went from Marietta all the way to Cleveland. Over time, though, parts of the route were renumbered or reassigned, especially south of Akron. In 1926 the portion from Marietta to Newcomerstown became U.S. Route 21. The same year the section from Newcomerstown to Uhrichsville became State Route 16 and SR 8 was rerouted from the Ohio River town of Fly to Uhrichsville. In 1969, the section from Fly to Canton was renumbered to State Route 800, the portion from Canton to Akron was deleted, and the southern end of the highway was truncated at Akron, at U.S. Route 224.

On August 6, 1954, the portion of the North Expressway in Akron opened from Perkins Street to Cuyahoga Falls Avenue. By 1962, it had been extended south to the Central Interchange and numbered Route 8B; it became mainline SR 8 in 1969 north of Market Street, and in its entirety by 1971. A section of freeway between Front Street (SR 59) and Graham Road in Cuyahoga Falls and Stow opened by 1972, with the connecting section opening in 1974. The freeway carried only the SR 59 designation between Tallmadge Avenue in Akron and Front Street in Cuyahoga Falls and had no posted number north of there until 1983, when the SR 8 designation was transferred to the freeway.  The final section of freeway opened on May 20, 1988, reaching State Route 303.

SR 8 from Interstate 77 to Perkins Street was rebuilt from 2003 to 2005. The freeway in that stretch previously had onramps and offramps built closely together, creating the danger of weaving traffic. Several ramps were removed and service roads were built on both sides of the freeway.

Route 8 from SR 303 north to Interstate 271 was converted to a full freeway without at-grade intersections between 2008 and 2011. The ramp between State Route 8 northbound and I-271 northbound opened July 24, 2009, and the opposite ramp opened on September 4. The new Turnpike interchange opened in December 2010, well ahead of the projected date of fall 2011.

An interchange was opened at Seasons Road in 2010 to serve the area near the borders of Cuyahoga Falls, Stow, and Hudson. Although the interchange was completed on January 25, 2010, it was not initially scheduled to open until one month later, on February 26, when an official ribbon-cutting could take place. Two weeks before the scheduled opening, an editorial in the Akron Beacon Journal lambasted the ribbon-cutting, calling the ceremony a mere "photo op", and questioning why a finished project should sit unused for 31 days. On February 21, the government of Stow, which had been responsible for holding the ceremony, announced the interchange would open in the morning of the next day without a ribbon-cutting.

In 2015 SR 8 was rerouted slightly in Shaker Heights due to a six-leg intersection being converted to a four-leg one.

Long-term plans for the road include a complete replacement of the North Expressway Viaduct between the Perkins Street and Glenwood Avenue exits, which is currently forecast to begin in 2023.

Interstate proposal
In January 2014, the Akron Metropolitan Area Transportation Study (AMATS) metropolitan planning organization proposed to designate the section between the central interchange in Akron (at I-76/77) to Macedonia (at I-271) as Interstate 380. ODOT declined the proposal for financial reasons. The letter was resubmitted in April 2014 with support from additional local officials, including Akron mayor Don Plusquellic, but no further discussion has taken place on the proposal.

Major intersections

References

External links

State Route 8 Endpoint Photos
District4Sight: Akron-area project overview

008
Transportation in Akron, Ohio
Transportation in Cuyahoga County, Ohio
Transportation in Summit County, Ohio
Cuyahoga Falls, Ohio
Transportation in Cleveland